Anadiscalia is a genus of bristle flies in the family Tachinidae.

Species
Anadiscalia basalis Curran, 1934

Distribution
Panama

References

Diptera of North America
Exoristinae
Tachinidae genera
Taxa named by Charles Howard Curran
Monotypic Brachycera genera